George Vladimir Bobrinskoy was a Russian-born American sanskritist. He was professor emeritus in the departments of linguistics, Slavic languages and South Asian literature and civilization at the University of Chicago.

Early life
George V. Bobrinskoy was born in Tula, Russia as Count Grigory Vladimirovich Bobrinskiy. He was a "left-hand" descendant of the Russian empress Catherine the Great. After the Russian Revolution he left his country at the end of the Civil war, fighting in the ranks of the Preobrajensky Guards regiment, and thereafter immigrated to the United States in 1923.

Then at Yale University he was a graduate student of Franklin Edgerton. Bobrinskoy left Yale University in 1927 to join the “Department of Comparative Philology, General Linguistics, and Indo-Iranian
Philology” at University of Chicago as the “Instructor in Sanskrit”. In the academic year 1929-30, he was promoted to Assistant Professor of Sanskrit of the department.

During the Second World War, the University of Chicago was selected as a Center for Russian language and area instruction under the Army Specialized Training Program. After the death of Samuel Northrup Harper the chairman of the Russian department in January 1943, Bobrinskoy his associate was asked to head the Russian-language program.

After the war he was chairman of the department of linguistics from 1951 to 1966 and dean of students in the humanities division from 1954 to 1967.

Personal life
Bobrinskoy was married to the civic leader Theodora P. Bobrinskoy with a son George V. Bobrinskoy Jr. and a daughter Theodora Bobrinskoy Shepherd. At University of Chicago he was also the tennis champion of the Quadrangle Club until beaten by Ignace Jay Gelb.

References
Notes

Citations

1900s births
1974 deaths
American Sanskrit scholars
University of Chicago faculty
Emigrants from the Russian Empire to the United States